Roland Boden was a professional footballer who played as a full back.

References

Year of birth missing
Year of death missing
Association football defenders
Burnley F.C. players
English Football League players
English footballers